Pithophoraceae is a family of green algae in the order Cladophorales.

See also 

 Aegagropila linnaei, a Pithophoraceae species that grows into large green velvety balls

References

 
Ulvophyceae families